Harold Humphrey Hackett (July 12, 1878 – November 20, 1937) was an American tennis player.

Biography
Born in Hingham, Massachusetts, but a long-time resident of New York, Hackett turned in his best results in doubles with Fred Alexander. Beginning in 1905, they were finalists at the U.S. National Championships a record seven consecutive years, winning in 1907, 1908, 1909, and 1910.

A graduate of Yale University, Hackett and Princeton University graduate Alexander won the U.S. Indoor doubles three times (1906–08), and he teamed with Walter Hall to win the U.S. Clay Court doubles title in 1912.

The following year, 1913, he was player-captain of the U.S. Davis Cup team that beat the United Kingdom in the final to win the Cup.

Hackett was ranked in the U.S. Top 10 twice: No. 9 in 1902 and at No. 7 in 1906 (when he was a U.S. quarter-finalist). He was inducted into the International Tennis Hall of Fame in 1961.

Hackett was a member of the Tennis Players' Committee who in 1915 advocated moving the National Tennis Championships from Newport, MA to Forrest Hills, NY.

In 1911, Hackett's wife divorced him for alleged acts of cruelty and that he publicly accused her of having a dozen affairs. On one occasion she said her and their two children were ill with ptomaine poisoning and Hackett was summoned immediately. Hackett arrived the following morning and only wanted to discuss their expense accounts, then quickly departed two hours later -- not to be heard from again for several months.

Grand Slam finals

Doubles (4 titles, 3 runner-ups)

References

External links
 
 
 
 

1878 births
1937 deaths
American male tennis players
People from Hingham, Massachusetts
Sportspeople from Plymouth County, Massachusetts
International Tennis Hall of Fame inductees
Tennis people from Massachusetts
Tennis people from New York (state)
United States National champions (tennis)
Yale Bulldogs men's tennis players
Grand Slam (tennis) champions in men's doubles